Suhail Al-Noubi  (Arabic:سُهَيْل النُّوبِيّ) (born 9 January 1996) is an Emirati footballer. He currently plays as a winger for Baniyas.

External links

References

Emirati footballers
1996 births
Living people
Baniyas Club players
UAE First Division League players
UAE Pro League players
Association football wingers